The 2006 Korean FA Cup Final was a football match played on 3 December 2006 at Seoul World Cup Stadium in Seoul that decided the winner of the 2006 season of the Korean FA Cup. The 2006 final was the culmination of the 11th season of the tournament.

The final was contested by Suwon Samsung Bluewings and Chunnam Dragons. The match kicked off at 15:00 KST. The referee for the match was Lee Ki-Young.

Road to the final

Suwon Samsung Bluewings

1Suwon's goals always recorded first.

Chunnam Dragons

1Chunnam's goals always recorded first.

Match details

See also
2006 Korean FA Cup

References

2006
FA
Korean FA Cup Final 2006
Korean FA Cup Final 2006